Acacia rhamphophylla, commonly known as Kundip wattle, is a shrub of the genus Acacia and the subgenus Phyllodineae that is endemic to a small area in south western Australia. It is listed as an endangered species according to the Environment Protection and Biodiversity Conservation Act 1999.

Description
Like most species of Acacia it has phyllodes rather than true leaves. The glabrous, dark green phyllodes are crowded on the branchlets. It blooms from August to September and produces yellow flowers.

Taxonomy
It is known to be closely related to Acacia laricina and Acacia cedroides and is also closely allied to Acacia pusilla.

Distribution
It is native to an area in the Goldfields-Esperance region of Western Australia where it is often situated on the higher areas of low ranges growing in rocky sandy clay soils. as  part of  open mallee scrub communities. Its limited range in the Ravensthorpe Range where it is found in an area of on vacant crown land, some of which is a mining lease. In 1992, there are known to be over 100 individual plants.

See also
 List of Acacia species

References

rhamphophylla
Acacias of Western Australia
Taxa named by Bruce Maslin
Plants described in 1999